is a district located in Niigata Prefecture, Japan.

As of July 1, 2019, the district has an estimated population of 7,824 and a density of 311 persons per km2. The total area is 25.17 km2.

Towns and villages 
The district consists of one village:

 Yahiko

History 

 After the town of Sekiya merged with the city of Niigata, back in 1889 in order to gain city status, the district continues to reduce in size by merging with surrounding areas.
 On March 31, 1954 - The town of Tsubame merged with three villages to gain city status.

Recent mergers 
 On January 1, 2001 - The town of Kurosaki was absorbed into the expanded city of Niigata.
 On March 21, 2005 - The town of Nishikawa and the villages of Ajikata, Iwamuro, Katahigashi, Nakanokuchi and Tsukigata were absorbed into the expanded city of Niigata.
 On October 10, 2005 - The town of Maki (former seat of this district) was absorbed into the expanded city of Niigata.
 On March 20, 2006 - The towns of Bunsui and Yoshida were merged into the expanded city of Tsubame.

Districts in Niigata Prefecture